Shep-en-Isis, or Schepenese, (-) was the daughter of Pa-es-tjenfi, a priest, and Tabes, of Thebes, Egypt; she was likely literate during her life and it is unknown who her husband was and it is also unknown if she had any children. Her mummified body is notable as her facial reconstruction was completed by forensic scientists in January 2022 and she is also one of the most famous mummies in Switzerland.

Biography
Shep-en-Isis was alive during the Fifth Dynasty and, based on the style of her coffin and what she looks like, she was born around 650 BC and died around 620 or 610 BC, aged between 30-40 years old. She was buried in a 'family tomb', along with her father Pa-es-tjenfi, located within the temple of Pharaoh Hatshepsut, Deir el-Bahari.

History as a mummy
Her mummy was discovered in a well-preserved state inside a casket in 1819 and in 1820, it was taken to the Abbey library of Saint Gall in Switzerland, making her one of the first mummies to be put on public display in Switzerland. Peter Scheitlin was the first to study the mummy of Shep-en-Isis and in 1836, the Catholic Grand Council College, as the supervising authority of the Abbey Library, decided to acquire the mummy for 440 guilders. Since then, it has officially been part of the inventory of the Abbey Library and is now considered one of the main attractions of the library. On June 27, 1903, an article by the Egyptologist Alexander Dedekind appeared in the St. Galler Tagblatt. In it, he dispelled the popular notion that the noble lady was the daughter of a pharaoh. Rather, it was the daughter of a priest. Dedekind translated her name as "Sheta-en-Isi" ("Secret of Isis"), which he improved shortly afterwards in other Tagblatt articles as "Schap-en-Isi" ("Gift of Isis"), or rather, "Shep-en-Isis".

During X-ray and computed tomography examinations in 1996, no evidence of an unusual cause of death could be found. The only apparent injuries were post mortem due to mummification itself. It was not until 2010 that the mummy could even be confirmed to belong to a woman. In January 2022, a paper was published about her mummy and a life reconstruction of her face was created.

References 

650s BC births
620s BC deaths
610s BC deaths
Mummies